Last Summer in the Hamptons is a 1995 ensemble comedy-drama film directed by Henry Jaglom and released by Rainbow Releasing and Live Entertainment.

Plot

The plot revolves around a family of theatre actors, directors, and playwrights spending their last summer together at their matriarch's (Viveca Lindfors as Helena Mora) home in the Hamptons. The summer house, named Proskurov (after Jaglom's father), is being sold as the family can no longer afford to keep it. Proskurov has been the site of an intimate outdoor theatrical performance for many summers, and the family (and Helena's interns) are preparing the final details of the show when successful Hollywood actress Oona Hart (Victoria Foyt) arrives. The film explores the dark underbelly of the family (with metaphorical help from Anton Chekhov, Aeschylus, and Tennessee Williams) as Oona attempts to attach herself to them and their theatrical endeavors as she seeks to leave Hollywood and embark on a stage career.

Cast

Box office
In the US, it grossed $801,894 for an all time ranking of 7,018.

References

External links

1995 films
1995 comedy-drama films
American comedy-drama films
Films about actors
Films about dysfunctional families
Films directed by Henry Jaglom
Films set in Long Island
1990s English-language films
1990s American films